Oscar Bianchi (born 1975 in Milan) is a Gaudeamus Laureate composer of Italian and Swiss citizenships. He is a recipient of several international prizes and honors. He is noted for his large scale works, in particular his cantata Matra for six voices and large ensemble and his opera Thanks to My Eyes.

Biography
Oscar Bianchi began music studies at the age of 7 under the guidance of Gabriella Montalbetti. In his teenage years, he enrolled at the Milan Conservatory and studied composition with Adriano Guarnieri, Sandro Gorli, Umberto Rotondi and with Salvatore Sciarrino in Città di Castello. In 2003 Oscar Bianchi will eventually foster his education in composition with Fausto Romitelli at the Royaumont Abbey. In name of the friendship that the two composers had established since the early 2000 and after the loss of who was seemingly becoming a mentor, Oscar Bianchi dedicated his composition Mezzogiorno to the memory of Fausto Romitelli.

 In 2003 he settles in Paris to attend to the yearlong composition and electronic music master course at IRCAM
 In 2005 he settles in New York City thanks to a fellowships from Columbia University to pursue doctoral studies under the guidance of Tristan Murail
 In 2009 he spends a year in Berlin as guest of the DAAD Künstlerprogramm Berlin
 in 2010 he spends several months in Warsaw as guest of Pro-Helvetia Warsaw at the Ujazdów Castle

Catalog
His works are published by Universal Music Publishing Group

Large ensemble, orchestra
Orango, for ensemble and audience (2018)
Roar, for symphonic orchestra (2017)
Contingency, for ensemble (2017)
Exordium, for symphonic orchestra (2015-2016)
Inventio, for symphonic orchestra (2014-2016)
Celeste discontinuità, for cello concertante and string orchestra (2013-2014)
Oneness, for clarinet, basset horn and orchestra (2013)
Permeability, for 19 instruments and electronics (2013)
Ajna Prelude, for orchestra (2010)
Vishudda Concerto, for ensemble (2009)
Anahata Concerto, for ensemble (2008)
Trasparente II, for ensemble (2007, rev 2008)
Aqba, nel soffio tuo dolce, for percussion ensemble (2005)
Mezzogiorno, for ensemble (2005)

Vocal and staged works 
Sinatra in Agony, music-theatre (2018)
Circled Existence, for electric guitar and six voices (2018)
Partendo, for countertenor and ensemble (2015)
Here, for soprano and string orchestra (2014)
The Past, for 11 performers (2014)
Approve, for countertenor and 8 instruments (2014)
Fluente, for soprano, barytone and bagpipes (2013)
Sotto Vuoto, for female voice and percussion (2012)
Lullaby, for male voice and five musicians (2012)
Ante Litteram, for six voices a cappella (also for six voices and bass clarinet) (2012-2013)
The Infinite Jest, for soprano, dancer and actress (2012)
Matra, Cantata for vocal ensemble, instrumental ensemble and trio concertante (2007)
Primordia Rerum, for soprano and ensemble (2003)

Instrumental 
Étude no 1, for piano (2018)
Senza, for recorder and violin (2018)
Antilope, for bass clarinet, cello and piano (2018)
Pathos of distance, string quartet no 2 (2017)
Topologia delle passioni, for wind quintet (2016)
Alteritas, for bass clarinet (2015)
Reinforced Sympathy, for two ouds (2015)
Derogatory Magnifier, for oboe solo (2014)
Docile ascesa, for contrabass solo (2014)
De Profundis, for basset horn solo (2011, rev 2013)
Adesso, string quartet no 1 (2011)
Schegge, for prepared piano (2011)
Gr…, for bass flute (2010)
Semplice, for violin (2010)
Zaffiro, for four instruments (2005)
Crepuscolo, for Paetzold contrabass recorder and electronics (2004)
De Rerum Natura, for flute and violin (2001)
Pathos of distance, string quartet no 2 (2017)

Awards 
2016 «Partendo», for countertenor and ensemble wins the 63rd International Music Council International Rostrum of Composers
2014 Grand Prix de la Musique SACEM, catégorie Musique Symphonique
2013 Portrait CD awarded Preis der Deutschen Schallplattenkritik
2013 Crepuscolo CD awarded Nutida Swedish prize
2012 Crepuscolo CD nominated for the Swedish Grammy Awards
2010 Prix Dussurget, Festival d'Aix-en-Provence
2008 Alarm Will Sound competition winner, Alice Tully Hall Reopening Nights Festival, Lincoln Center – New York
2005-2007 ICTUS ensemble, Brussels: composer in residence
2005 Gaudeamus first prize
2004 Aargauer Kuratorium, Switzerland: Career grant (Beitrag an das künstlerische Schaffen)

Selected discography 
Portrait CD, Klangforum Wien, Ensemble Modern, Ictus Ensemble, Nieuw Ensemble, and others. 2013 MGB, CTS-M 138
Matra, Ictus Ensemble, Neue Vocalsolisten Stuttgart, Susanne Fröhlich, Rico Gübler, Michael Schmid, George-Elie Octors. 2013 Sub Rosa Record, CYP4502
Semplice, Miranda Cuckson. UAV-CD-5998
Crepuscolo, Anna Petrini. 2012 db Production, dbCD143
Grammont Sélection 4', Paolo Vignaroli. 2010 MGB, CTS-M 130

Collaborations
Oscar Bianchi has written for and collaborated with artists such as Pablo Heras-Casado, Sabine Meyer, Jack Quartet, Quatuor Diotima, David Grimal, Franck Ollu, Joel Pommerat, Constanza Macras Stefan Asbury, Pascal Rophé, Enno Poppe, Miranda Cuckson, Baldur Brönnimann, Brad Lubman.
with orchestras such as the Gewandhaus Orchestra, Orchestre Philharmonique de Radio France, Deutsche Symphonie Orchester, Klangforum Wien, Ensemble Modern, Ictus, Uusinta Ensemble, Neuevocalsolisten Stuttgart, Remix Ensemble, Alarm Will Sound, International Contemporary Ensemble, Les Percussions de Strasbourg, Nieuw Ensemble, Ensemble l’Itinéraire, Ensemble Contrechamps, Kammerensemble für neue Musik Berlin, Phoenix Ensemble, Drumming Grupo de Percussão from Porto, Ensemble Laboratorium, Österreichisches Ensemble für neue Musik, Sound’arte Eklekto, San Francisco Contemporary Music Players.
Oscar Bianchi has taught composition at Columbia University, at the Royaumont Abbey and at the Luzern Musikhochschule

References

External links

 

Columbia Composers
Festival Musica, Strasbourg - Oscar Bianchi
Oscar Bianchi - bureauexport
Творческая встреча с композитором Оскаром Бьянки
Oscar Bianchi - Compositeurs - Biographie - Musinfo
Oscar Bianchi's biography  on Cdmc's website
Sound recordings of works of the composer from the archives of Swiss Radio SRG SSR on Neo.Mx3

Italian composers
Italian male composers
Swiss composers
Swiss male composers
Gaudeamus Composition Competition prize-winners
Musicians from Milan
1975 births
Living people